Master and Everyone is a 2003 studio album by Bonnie 'Prince' Billy. It was released on Drag City.

Critical reception

At Metacritic, which assigns a weighted average score out of 100 to reviews from mainstream critics, the album received an average score of 83, based on 11 reviews, indicating "universal acclaim".

NME named it the 37th best album of 2003.

Track listing

Personnel
Credits adapted from liner notes.

 Will Oldham
 Paul Oldham
 Tony Crow – keyboards
 William Tyler – guitar
 Matt Swanson – tambourine
 Gary Lee Tussing – cello
 Marty Slayton – vocals
 John Kelton – whistle

Charts

References

External links
 

2003 albums
Will Oldham albums
Drag City (record label) albums
Domino Recording Company albums